Annika is a three-part mini-series written and produced by Colin Nutley and Sven-Gösta Holst and televised in 1984. It tells the story of a romance between Pete, an eighteen year old Isle of Wight deck chair attendant (played by Jesse Birdsall) and a Swedish foreign language student, the titular Annika (played by Christina Rignér).

Cast
 Christina Rignér as Annika Sellberg
 Jesse Birdsall as Pete Daniels 
 Ann-Charlotte Stålhammar as Pia
 Birger Österberg as Per
 Anders Bongenhielm as Torbjörn
 Vas Blackwood as Alan
 Lia Williams as Karen
 Mark Drewry as Bill Bartender
 Christer Boustedt as Mr. Sellberg
 Don Henderson as Mr. Daniels
 Lena Strömdahl as Mrs. Sellberg

Episodes

Production

Background 
Swedish foreign language students from companies such as EF have been regular visitors to the Isle of Wight since the 1970s and romances such as the one depicted in this series were not uncommon.

Filming locations 
The series was filmed in and around Ryde, parts of London and in Sweden, Stockholm and the surrounding area. Ryde locations included the head of Ryde Pier (at the start of episode 1) and the Prince Consort bar.

Music 
Episode 1 featured scenes in the Prince Consort bar with live music being played by the, then popular, Isle of Wight band The Waltons.

Home media
A region 2 DVD entitled Annika The Complete Series was released by Network in 2011.

References

External links
 

1980s British drama television series
ITV miniseries
1980s British television miniseries
1984 British television series debuts
1984 British television series endings
1980s British romance television series
Television series by ITV Studios
Television shows produced by Central Independent Television
English-language television shows